Jacob Dockstader Buell (October 4, 1827 – January 1, 1894) was a lawyer and political figure in Ontario, Canada. He represented Brockville in the House of Commons of Canada from 1872 to 1878 as a Liberal member.

He was born in Brockville, Upper Canada, the son of William Buell, and was educated there. He was called to the bar in 1854 and practised law in Brockville. His first wife was Susan Chaffey; after her death in 1857, he married Margaret Sophia Senkler in 1861. Buell was a Lieutenant-Colonel in the local militia, and raised the Brockville Infantry Company in 1862 after the Trent Affair. He served as mayor for Brockville for seven years. In 1871, Buell ran unsuccessfully for a seat in the provincial legislature. He was defeated by William Fitzsimmons in a bid for reelection to the federal seat in 1878.

Electoral record

References 

1827 births
1894 deaths
Liberal Party of Canada MPs
Members of the House of Commons of Canada from Ontario
Mayors of Brockville